Love, Peace & Poetry – Vol.9 Turkish is the ninth volume in the Love, Peace & Poetry series released by QDK Media and Normal Records in 2005. This volume explores obscuro garage rock and psychedelic rock bands from Turkey.

A Track with a Sample of "Ince Ince Bir Kar Yagar" was created by Oh No (Dr. No's Oxperiment,2007) and has later been used in commercials for the videogame Skate 2.

Track listing
 "Bundan Sonra" (Selda Bağcan from the album "Vurulduk Ey Halkim Unutma Bizi") – 4:09
 "Uzun Ince Bir Yoldayim " (Özdemir Erdogan Ve Orkestrasi) – 3:13
 "Kirpiklerin Ok Ok Eyle" (Alpay) – 1:58
 "Sür Efem Atini" (Mazhar Ve Fuat from the album "Türküz Türkü Çağırırız!") – 2:23
 "Yagmur" (Erkin Koray) – 3:33
 "Kara Yazi" (Ersen from the album "Dünden Bugüne") – 3:28
 "Yakar Inceden Inceden" (Edip Akbayram) – 3:49
 "Bir Yagmur Masali" (Hardal from the album "Nasil Ne Zaman") – 6:12
 "Ince Ince Bir Kar Yagar" (Selda) – 3:40
 "Hop Dedik" (Erol Büyükburç from the album "Hop Dedik") – 3:28
 "Tatli Dillim" (Cem Karaca from the album "Kardaslar Apaslar") – 4:13
 "Aglarsa Anam Aglar" (Üç Hürel from the album "Hürel Arsivi") – 3:21
 "Kirpiklerin Ok Ok Eyle" (Barış Manço from the album "Dünden Bugüne") – 4:12
 "Haliçte Günesin Batisi" (Mogollar from the album "Anadolu Pop") – 4:11
 "Sen Varsin" (Bülent Ortaçgil from the album "Benimle OynarMisin") – 2:11
 "Gitmek Düstü Bana" (Erkut Taçkin from the album "Benimle OynarMisin") – 2:49

Love, Peace & Poetry albums
Psychedelic rock albums by Turkish artists
2005 compilation albums